Sigmar Berg (born 1975 in Austria) is an American entrepreneur, artist, photographer, and fashion designer best known for the Lovetuner, a mindfulness meditation tool that supposedly claims to bring personal healing to the user via the 528 hz frequency, also known as the love frequency. Berg is also the founder of +Beryll, a luxury accessory company that specializes in designer sunglasses and other lifestyle accessories.

Biography

Early life, career
Berg was born in Austria. Trained as an architect, he worked in photography while in Europe, primarily shooting catalogs and commercial jobs. He also worked as a painter and fashion designer. Berg moved to Los Angeles in 2006 with his family while on hiatus from his work as an abstract artist. As a celebrated photographer, Berg’s exhibit entitled “Developed Views II” premiered at West Hollywood’s Ambrogi-Castanier Gallery in June 2008 and was featured in the Los Angeles Times.

+Beryll
+Beryll was founded in 2006 in Los Angeles, California, after Berg began designing accessories in his Santa Monica studio. He originally focused on hand-made sunglasses for the brand, later expanding into jewelry, handbags, boots, belts, hats, scarves, leather vests, and other accessories. Sigmar is "largely influenced by his European roots", and in particular the architectural style of Bauhaus. His products tend to be unisex, also incorporating styles of Southern California. The +Beryll brand was founded on the concept of fashion mindfulness. His brand supports the use of locally sourced materials and artisans.

The company has a flagship store in Santa Monica, California, with products sold at over 500 stores such as Barney's, Henri Bendel, Maxfield, and Fred Segal. Berg's designs have been worn by celebrities like Angelina Jolie,  Robert De Niro, Kim Basinger, Nicolas Cage and others. His sunglasses have been worn by Sarah Jessica Parker, Anna Pacquin, and Sharon Stone.

Lovetuner 
In 2014, Berg launched Lovetuner in Malibu, California.  Lovetuner is a mindfulness meditation instrument, a small flute, calibrated to 528 hz. The Lovetuner is a stylish necklace worn close to your heart, combining a profound breathing exercise with 528 hz, supposedly known as the love frequency, for attunement and alignment of the human body. Certain researchers claim that the positive effects of 528 hz sound frequencies on the brain reduce anxiety and promote wellness. Berg created the Lovetuner with the intention of bringing wellness and healing to all peoples around the globe.

The Lovetuner has been endorsed by well-known author and alternative-medicine advocate, Deepak Chopra, as well as other advocates of mind-body medicine, including Marla Maples and film maker Barnet Bain. In May 2020, actress Denise Richards declared the Lovetuner as "something she can't live without." In April, 2021, Buzzfeed cited Lovetuner as its #1 pick for anxiety relief.

The Lovetuner Foundation 
Thanks to the commercial success of Lovetuner, Berg established the Lovetuner Foundation, a nonprofit organization that claims to promote wellness and healing. The Foundation has a three-pronged focus: to bring the Lovetuner product to schools as a tool to help students and teachers overcome stress and anxiety; to assist in the relief of PTSD and suicide prevention within the Veterans' community; and to sponsor retreats for underprivileged children, aimed at overcoming trauma, building unity, and promoting healing.

Personal life
Berg lives in Malibu, California, USA.

References

External links

lovetuner.com

Living people
1975 births
Austrian fashion designers
Austrian photographers
Mindfulness movement